The Scottish Liberal Democrats is a liberal, federalist political party in Scotland, a part of the United Kingdom Liberal Democrats. The party currently holds 4 of the 129 seats in the Scottish Parliament and 4 of the 59 Scottish seats in the House of Commons.

The Scottish Liberal Democrats is one of the three state parties within the federal Liberal Democrats, the others being the Welsh Liberal Democrats and the English Liberal Democrats. The Liberal Democrats do not contest elections in Northern Ireland.

History

Formation and early years
The Scottish Liberal Democrat party was formed by the merger of the Scottish Liberal Party and the Social Democratic Party (SDP) in Scotland, as part of the merger of the Liberal Party and SDP on 3 March 1988.

The party campaigned for the creation of a devolved Scottish Parliament as part of its wider policy of a federal United Kingdom. In the late 1980s and 1990s it and its representatives participated in the Scottish Constitutional Convention with Scottish Labour, the Scottish Greens, trades unions and churches. It also campaigned for a "Yes-Yes" vote in the 1997 devolution referendum.

1999–2007: Coalition government with Labour
In the first elections to the Scottish Parliament in 1999, the Scottish Lib Dems won 17 seats. Following this, it formed a coalition government with Scottish Labour in the Scottish Executive. The then party leader, Jim Wallace, became Deputy First Minister of Scotland and Minister for Justice. He also served as acting First Minister on three occasions, during the illness and then later, the death of the first First Minister Donald Dewar and the following resignation of his successor Henry McLeish. This partnership was renewed in 2003 and Wallace became Deputy First Minister and Minister for Enterprise and Lifelong Learning. On 23 June 2005, Nicol Stephen MSP succeeded Wallace as party leader and took over his positions in the Executive until the 2007 elections.

Prior to the partnership government being formed in 1999, the UK had only limited experience of coalition government. The Lib Dems' participation attracted criticism for involving compromises to its preferred policies, although several of its manifesto pledges were adopted as government policy or legislation. These included changes to the arrangements for student contributions to higher education costs (although whether that amounted to the claimed achievement of having abolished tuition fees was hotly contested), free personal care for the elderly and (during the second coalition government) changing the system of elections for Scottish local authorities to the single transferable vote, a long-standing Liberal Democrat policy.

2007–2011: Opposition
In the 2007 Scottish Parliament election, the party won one fewer seat than in the two previous Scottish elections: this was the first parliamentary election for 28 years in which the party's parliamentary strength in Scotland was reduced. This experience led to some criticism of the party's election strategy and its leader. Although it was arithmetically possible to form a majority coalition with the Scottish National Party (SNP) and the Scottish Greens, the party refused to participate in coalition negotiations because of a disagreement over the SNP's policy of a referendum on Scottish independence, and sat as an opposition party in the Parliament.

On 2 July 2008, Nicol Stephen resigned as party leader, citing the "stresses and strains" of the job. Former deputy leader Michael Moore MP served as acting leader of the party until Tavish Scott MSP was elected party leader on 26 August 2008, winning 59% of the votes cast in a contest with parliamentary colleagues Ross Finnie and Mike Rumbles.

2011–2021: Electoral decline 
At the 2011 Scottish Parliament election, the party lost all its mainland constituencies, retaining only the two constituencies of Orkney and Shetland; it also secured three List MSPs. This was, at the time, by far the party's worst electoral performance since the re-establishment of a Scottish Parliament in 1999. The disastrous results were blamed on a backlash to the Lib Dems' coalition with the Conservative Party. Scott resigned as party leader on 7 May, and the resulting leadership election was won by Willie Rennie ten days later.

At the 2014 European Parliament election, the party lost its only MEP, leaving it with no representation for the first time since 1994. The party lost 10 of its 11 MPs at the 2015 general election with only Alistair Carmichael narrowly retaining his seat, holding Orkney and Shetland with a 3.6% majority.

At the 2016 Scottish Parliament election, the party again had five MSPs elected but was pushed into 5th place by the Scottish Greens. While it regained the two constituency seats of Edinburgh Western and North East Fife from the SNP, its vote share fell slightly overall.

At the 2017 general election, the party retained Orkney and Shetland with an increased majority, as well as regaining three seats lost to the SNP in 2015 – Caithness, Sutherland and Easter Ross, East Dunbartonshire and Edinburgh West. The Scottish Liberal Democrats lost out on the North East Fife constituency to Stephen Gethins of the SNP by just two votes, making it the most marginal result in the UK at the general election that year.

In the 2019 European Parliament election, they re-gained a Member of European Parliament, Sheila Ritchie, for the Scotland Region until the United Kingdom left the European Union in early 2020.

Two years later, at the 2019 general election, UK Lib Dem leader Jo Swinson lost East Dunbartonshire to Amy Callaghan of the SNP by 150 votes, and was forced to stand down as leader; but the Liberal Democrats successfully regained North East Fife and retained four seats in Scotland. The Scottish Lib Dems replaced Scottish Labour as the third-largest party in Scotland in terms of seats at the 2019 general election, in a historic landslide defeat for the party nationwide.

At the 2021 Scottish Parliament election, only 4 MSPs were elected for the Lib Dems, holding onto their 4 constituency seats while losing their single regional seat in North East Scotland. The party's vote share also declined further, reaching a new low in both constituency and list vote share at a Scottish Parliamentary election, and 50 deposits were lost out of the 73 constituencies contested. The resulted in the party dropping below the five-seat threshold to be recognised as a parliamentary party in the Scottish Parliament, and as a result losing certain parliamentary rights such as a guaranteed question at First Minister's Questions. Following the election, Rennie resigned as leader, and was replaced by Alex Cole-Hamilton in August 2021 after he stood to run unopposed.

2022–present 
After winning 87 council seats in the 2022 Scottish local elections, an increase from 67 in 2017, party leader Alex Cole-Hamilton announced a target of 150 councillors by 2027.

Leadership

Leader

Deputy Leaders

Current party leadership, office bearers and committee members 
 Leader: Alex Cole-Hamilton MSP
 Deputy Leader: Wendy Chamberlain MP
 Convener: Sheila Ritchie 
 Treasurer: Steve Arrundale
 President: Willie Wilson
 Vice-Convener, Policy: Vacant
 Vice-Convener, Conference: Paul McGarry 
 Vice-Convener, Campaigns & Candidates: Jenny Marr

Structure 
In keeping with its basis as a federation of organisations, the Scottish party also consists of a number of local parties (which mostly follow the boundaries of the Scottish Council Areas), which are each distinct accounting units under the Political Parties, Elections and Referendums Act 2000. Local parties are predominantly responsible for the party's political campaigning and for selecting candidates for parliamentary and local authority elections.

There are also eight regional parties (based on the boundaries of the eight Scottish Parliament electoral regions).

Administration 
The party's headquarters are located in Edinburgh. The conference is the highest decision-making body of the party on both policy and strategic issues. The day-to-day organisation of the party is the responsibility of the party's Executive Committee, which is chaired by the Convener of the party and includes the Leader, the Depute Leader and the President of the party, as well as the party Treasurer and the three Vice-Conveners. All party members vote every two years in internal elections to elect people to all the below positions, except Leader & Depute Leader.

Conferences 
Like the Federal party, the Scottish party holds two conferences per year; a Spring Conference, and an Autumn Conference.

Associated organisations 
Associated organisations generally seek to influence the direction of the party on a specific issue or represent a section of the party membership.  The party has five associated organisations:
 Association of Scottish Liberal Democrat Councillors and Campaigners (ASLDC)
 LGBT+ Liberal Democrats
 Scottish Green Liberal Democrats
 Scottish Women Liberal Democrats
 Scottish Young Liberals

Association of Scottish Liberal Democrat Councillors and Campaigners 
The Association of Scottish Liberal Democrat Councillors (ASLDC) is a network of Liberal Democrat councillors and local campaigners across Scotland which works to support and develop Liberal Democrat involvement in Scottish Local Government. Following the Local Council Election of May 2017, under the Single Transferable Vote (STV) system, 67 Liberal Democrats were elected, a drop of 3 on Local Council Election of May 2012. A voluntary Executive Committee meets several times a year to run the organisation. ASLDC works alongside Liberal Democrats in the Convention of Scottish Local Authorities (CoSLA) where Peter Barrett is leader of the Lib Dem Group.

Policy platform

The Scottish Party decides its policy on state matters independently from the federal party. State matters include not only currently devolved issues but also those reserved matters which the party considers should be devolved to the Scottish Parliament, including broadcasting, energy, drugs and abortion. The party also believes that the Scottish Parliament should exercise greater responsibility on fiscal matters. A party commission chaired by former Liberal Party leader and Scottish Parliament Presiding Officer Sir David Steel set out the party's proposals on the constitutional issue.

According to its constitution, the party believes in a "fair, free and open society ... in which no-one shall be enslaved by poverty, ignorance or conformity". It has traditionally argued for both positive and negative liberties, tolerance of social diversity, decentralisation of political authority, including proportional representation for public elections, internationalism and greater involvement in the European Union. In the 2007 elections it campaigned for reforms to public services and local taxation, and for more powers for the Scottish Parliament within a federal Britain.

In December 2007, the party (along with Scottish Labour and the Scottish Conservatives) supported the creation of a new Commission on Scottish Devolution, along similar lines to the earlier Scottish Constitutional Convention, to discuss further powers for the Scottish Parliament.

In 2012, the Scottish Liberal Democrats joined the Better Together campaign with other Unionist political parties to campaign for a No vote in the 2014 Scottish independence referendum, with Craig Harrow, then convener of the party, joining the Board of Directors.

They campaigned to for the UK and Scotland to remain a member of the European Union via the Stronger In preceding the 2016 United Kingdom European Union membership referendum

In 2021, the Scottish Liberal Democrats negotiated a budget agreement with the SNP Scottish government, helping pass the Scottish budget with the condition of additional funding for community mental health services, schools and renewables retraining for people in the oil and gas sector in North East Scotland.

In the Scottish Parliament election later that year, their manifesto pledges included training more mental health specialists, an NHS recovery plan after the COVID-19 pandemic, investing in low carbon heat networks, new national parks, a universal basic income, play-based education, opposing a second independence referendum and moving homes to zero-emission heating.

Elected representatives (current)

Scottish Parliament

House of Commons of the United Kingdom

Electoral performance

Scottish Parliament

House of Commons
This chart shows the electoral results of the Scottish Liberal Democrats, from the first election the party contested in 1992. Total number of seats, and vote percentage, is for Scotland only. For results prior to 1992, see Scottish Liberal Party.

European Parliament

Local elections

Appointments

House of Lords

See also
 English Liberal Democrats
 Welsh Liberal Democrats
 Northern Ireland Liberal Democrats

References

External links 

 

 
Liberal Democrats (UK)
1988 establishments in Scotland
Liberal parties in the United Kingdom
Organisation of the Liberal Democrats (UK)
Organisations based in Edinburgh
Political parties established in 1988